MOPS International is a Christian organization focused on women and mothers.

MOPS International, Inc. is headquartered in Denver, Colorado. The organization had its first meeting in February 1973 in Wheat Ridge, Colorado,  established a board of directors in 1981, and was incorporated under the name MOPS Outreach. The name was later changed to MOPS, Inc. In 1988, as they expanded beyond the US, the name was changed again, to MOPS International, Inc. In 2017, there were about 4,000 groups worldwide.

Original founders included Marlene Seidel and seven others at Trinity Baptist Church.

References

External links
 MOPS International, Inc.
 MOPs in Holland

Parents' organizations
Christian organizations established in 1973
Women's organizations based in the United States
Christian parachurch organizations
History of women in Colorado